Vicary Challenor (15 May 1883 – 25 March 1973) was a Barbadian cricketer. He played in ten first-class matches for the Barbados cricket team from 1900 to 1904.

See also
 List of Barbadian representative cricketers

References

External links
 

1883 births
1973 deaths
Barbadian cricketers
Barbados cricketers
People from Saint Michael, Barbados